Jaume Fort Mauri (born July 25, 1966) is a Spanish handball player who competed in the 1988 Summer Olympics, in the 1992 Summer Olympics, and in the 1996 Summer Olympics.

He was born in Cardedeu.

In 1988 he was a member of the Spanish handball team which finished ninth in the Olympic tournament. He played two matches as goalkeeper.

Four years later he was part of the Spanish team which finished fifth in the 1992 Olympic tournament. He played five matches as goalkeeper.

At the 1996 Games he won the bronze medal with the Spanish team. He played six matches as goalkeeper.

External links
 profile

1966 births
Living people
Spanish male handball players
Handball players from Catalonia
Olympic handball players of Spain
Handball players at the 1988 Summer Olympics
Handball players at the 1992 Summer Olympics
Handball players at the 1996 Summer Olympics
Olympic bronze medalists for Spain
BM Ciudad Real players
Olympic medalists in handball
Medalists at the 1996 Summer Olympics
BM Granollers players